The 1927–28 Magyar Kupa (English: Hungarian Cup) was the 11th season of Hungary's annual knock-out cup football competition.

Final

See also
 1927–28 Nemzeti Bajnokság I

References

External links
 Official site 
 soccerway.com

1927–28 in Hungarian football
1927–28 domestic association football cups
1927-28